Héctor García García (born 3 May 1963 in Guadalupe, Nuevo León) is a Mexican politician affiliated with the PRI. He currently serves as Deputy of the LXII Legislature of the Mexican Congress representing Nuevo León.

References

1963 births
Living people
People from Guadalupe, Nuevo León
Institutional Revolutionary Party politicians
21st-century Mexican politicians
Deputies of the LXII Legislature of Mexico
Members of the Chamber of Deputies (Mexico) for Nuevo León